Magnus von Eberhardt (6 December 1855 – 24 January 1939) was a Prussian military officer and a German General der Infanterie during World War I.  He received the Pour le Mérite (Prussia's and Germany's highest military honor) with Oakleaves (signifying a second award) and was a Rechtsritter (Knight of Justice) of the Johanniterorden (Order of Saint John).

Pre war
Magnus von Eberhardt was born on 6 December 1855 in Berlin.  He began his military career in 1874 (at age 19) as a Sekonde-Lieutenant in the 93rd (Anhalt) Infantry Regiment at Zerbst.

World War I
At the outbreak of the war, von Eberhardt was Military Governor of Straßburg, then in the German Imperial territory of Alsace-Lorraine.  On 1 September 1914 he took command of the temporary Corps Eberhardt named for him.  On 1 December 1914 it was established as XV Reserve Corps and on 1 September 1916 it was renamed as XV Bavarian Reserve Corps.  On 16 October 1916, he transferred to command X Reserve Corps.

In August 1918, he temporarily took command of 7th Army from Max von Boehn on the Western Front before going on to command 1st Army just before the end of the War.

Von Eberhardt was awarded the Pour le Mérite on 20 May 1917. He was awarded the Oakleaves on 22 September 1917.

Post war
In 1919, von Eberhardt was appointed to the defense of Eastern Prussia as commander of the Kulmer Land Defence Forces.  In the spring of 1919, he received the order to withdraw from the territory of Soldau and Polish troops took possession.

Von Eberhardt died in Berlin on 24 January 1939 at the age of 83. He was interred in the Invalidenfriedhof.

References

Bibliography 
 

1855 births
1939 deaths
German untitled nobility
German Army generals of World War I
Military personnel from Berlin
Generals of Infantry (Prussia)
Recipients of the Pour le Mérite (military class)
Burials at the Invalids' Cemetery
People from the Province of Brandenburg